Wizz Air, legally incorporated as Wizz Air Hungary Ltd. is a Hungarian ultra-low-cost carrier with its head office in Budapest, Hungary. The airline serves many cities across Europe, as well as some destinations in North Africa, the Middle East, and South Asia. It has the largest fleet of any Hungarian airline, although it is not a flag carrier, and serves 44 countries. Its Jersey-based parent company, Wizz Air Holdings plc, is listed on the London Stock Exchange and is a constituent of the FTSE 250 Index. As of 2020, the airline has its largest bases at Budapest Ferenc Liszt International Airport and London Luton Airport and flies to 164 airports.

History

Foundation and expansion 
The airline was established in September 2003. The lead investor is Indigo Partners, an American private equity firm specialising in transportation investments. The first flight was made from Katowice International Airport on 19 May 2004. The airline's CEO is József Váradi, former CEO of Malév Hungarian Airlines. The company is registered in Pest County, Hungary.

On 25 February 2015, Wizz Air shares began trading on the London Stock Exchange.

In November 2017, Wizz Air announced its planned launch of a British division called Wizz Air UK, based at London Luton mainly to take advantage of landing slots acquired when Monarch Airlines entered administration that year. The airline applied successfully to the CAA for an AOC and a Type A Operating Licence. The airline launched operations in March 2018 using British registered aircraft. Wizz Air UK was to start taking over UK-bound flights previously operated by Wizz Air, and plans called for the airline to employ up to 100 staff by the end of 2018.

In November 2018, Wizz Air announced plans to reactivate its Wizz Air Ukraine subsidiary, approximately three years after its closure. The airline would seek to complete certification in 2019 following the acquisition of twenty A320/321 neo jets. Bases were to be developed in Kyiv and cities across the country, with a planned passenger throughput of 6 million per annum by 2025.

Pandemic and survival 
By early 2020, the COVID-19 pandemic created a case of force majeure in European aviation, gradually forcing airline fleets to land, including the majority of Wizz Air aircraft. Although it was announced in March that no redundancies were planned, one-fifth of the staff was redeemed when it became clear that air travel across the continent was shutting down. In April 2020, based on passenger numbers, Wizz Air became Europe's largest low-cost airline with 78,000 passengers. By mid-June, they had reached 40 percent of their previous year's normal weekly revenue, while the proportion of no-shows fell from 80 percent in April to 30 percent. In July 2020, the airline announced that it will form a joint venture with the Abu Dhabi Developmental Holding Company.

In October 2020, Wizz took delivery of an A330-200F cargo aircraft (HA-LHU, formerly Qatar Cargo), operating it on behalf of the Hungarian Government as 'Hungary Air Cargo'. The same month, it announced that its first Scandinavian base would be opened at Oslo's Gardermoen Airport in November 2020; the two aircraft based there would also undertake domestic flights within Norway. However, ticket sales for domestic flights after 13 June 2021 were subsequently stopped.

In 2020, Wizz Air carried a total of 16.6 million passengers, 42 per cent of the 40 million passengers of the previous year. At the same time, the airline also tried to view the pandemic as an opportunity, opening 260 new routes and 13 bases, one of them at London's second largest airport, Gatwick.

In the spring of 2021, as the third wave of the coronavirus epidemic arrived, the airline's CEO pitched Wizz Air to investors as a "rare ray of investment hope". He said that he hoped that air transport would be restored by 2024–2025, and that he was confident that Wizz Air would be the only airline to continue its investments, made possible by the fact that it had the highest liquidity in the entire airline industry.

Wizz Air has prioritised fleet development and airport construction in its investments, with the opening of Brașov Airport planned for November 2022.

Renewed expansion 
On 3 February 2021, Wizz Air announced the opening of its second base in Bosnia and Herzegovina, after Tuzla; the airline would open a base at Sarajevo with one Airbus A320. The airline announced nine new destinations from Sarajevo with 21 weekly departures.

In April 2021, as planned, Wizz Air added Abu Dhabi to its services, offering connections to Europe beyond the UAE to neighbouring Arab countries.

By July 2021, Wizz Air had reached their 2019 capacity. Their plan was to develop their fleet of 140 aircraft to a capacity of 500 by the end of the decade.

In August 2021, company management announced that they plan to hire 4,600 new pilots by 2030, with the first part of their plan to train and hire nearly 500 pilots by the end of 2021.

In September 2021, rival low-cost carrier EasyJet claimed it had rejected a takeover offer from Wizz Air.

On 14 November 2021, on the first day of the Dubai Airshow, Wizz Air was one of four airlines that ordered additional A321neo jets. Wizz Air is due to receive a total of 75 A321neo and 27 A321XLRs, adding up to 102 new aircraft.

In May 2022, Wizz Air said it had signed a memorandum of understanding with Saudi Arabia's Ministry of Investment to collaborate on potential investment and operating models to boost the country's tourism industry and increase its connectivity. The same month, the company announced its intention to form a subsidiary in Malta, named Wizz Air Malta. In August 2022, it was announced that former Ryanair executive Diarmuid O Conghaile would join the newly formed company as managing director from 1 November 2022.

War situation 
Following the 2022 Russian invasion of Ukraine, four Wizz Air aircraft were stranded in Ukraine, three in Kyiv and one in Lviv though the aircraft at Lviv has since been recovered and re-entered service.

Flying was curtailed for two weeks by the outbreak of war, but Wizz Air soon returned to normal operations with the exception of the Ukrainian and Russian markets, which remained suspended. 

In March 2022, amid the invasion, Wizz Air provided 100,000 free airline tickets to refugees for short-distance flights from Poland, Slovakia, Hungary and Romania.

Corporate affairs

Head office
Since March 2015, Wizz Air's head office has been in Laurus Offices (Laurus Irodaház), Building B, Budapest. Previously headquartered at Budapest Ferenc Liszt International Airport, Wizz Air signed the Laurus lease in October 2010 and moved there with 150 employees in June 2011. The facility, with open-plan offices, housed about 150 employees. Before the time its head office was at the airport, it was in the Airport Business Park C2 in Vecsés, close to the airport.

Operations
As is common with European low-cost carriers, Wizz Air prefers operating out of smaller or secondary airports to reduce costs and fees. It also has a buy-on-board food service called Wizz Café, and a service called Wizz Boutique for other items.

On 8 June 2022, the company signed a memorandum of understanding with European aircraft manufacturer Airbus to work on the development of hydrogen-powered aircraft.

Subsidiaries
Current subsidiaries
Wizz Air Abu Dhabi was founded on 12 December 2019 as Wizz Air's UAE subsidiary. The airline is a joint venture with state-owned Abu Dhabi Development Holding, ADDH, which owns 51 per cent. Flights are operated from Abu Dhabi International Airport to destinations in Europe, Asia and Africa.
Wizz Air UK was founded on 18 October 2017 as Wizz Air's UK unit, following CAA approval the subsidiary commenced operations with 10 registered aircraft initially. The unit is currently operating flights from and to Luton on behalf of its Hungarian parent and has been set up to ensure Wizz Air retains full market access to the United Kingdom following Brexit.
Wizz Air Malta was founded in 2022 and operated its first flight on 27 September 2022 from Rome Fiumicino to Malta International Airport. The company's Air Operator Certificate was issues by the European Union Aviation Safety Agency (EASA) and its Operating Licence by the Malta Civil Aviation Directorate.

Former subsidiaries
Wizz Air Bulgaria was Wizz Air's Bulgarian unit set-up in 2005 and based at Sofia Airport with a fleet of 3 aircraft. It ceased operations on 31 March 2011, all flights merged back into Wizz Air Hungary Ltd.
Wizz Air Romania was a planned Romanian unit to be based at Timișoara Traian Vuia International Airport. However, this sub-unit never started operations and a base was established there instead of under Wizz Air Hungary Ltd.
Wizz Air Ukraine, founded in 2008, was the Ukrainian unit of Wizz Air, which had its own air operator's certificate and operated from Kyiv Zhuliany International Airport and Lviv International Airport with a fleet of 4 aircraft. As a result of the economic crisis caused by the Russo-Ukrainian War, Wizz Air Ukraine was terminated on 19 April 2015. Some routes to and from Kyiv were taken over by Wizz Air Hungary Ltd, while all others ceased. The airline eventually began expanding once again in Ukraine. As of October 2016, it operated flights to 13 cities in 7 countries from Kyiv.

Destinations

Wizz Air started new services between Katowice and London Luton in 2008. In January 2008, flights started from Gdansk to Gothenburg, Bournemouth and Coventry. In summer 2008, Wizz Air restarted summer seasonal services from Katowice and Budapest to Girona, as well as a new weekly service to Girona from Gdańsk. Other summer services from Budapest are Heraklion, Corfu, Burgas and Varna; from Katowice to Crete-Heraklion and Burgas; and Warsaw to Corfu and Burgas. It also restarted its three-times-weekly service from London–Luton to Burgas. On 2 October 2008, Wizz Air announced that a number of its Romanian services would have increased frequency following an order for three Airbus A320 aircraft.

In February 2012, Wizz Air announced that it would start flights from Debrecen International Airport to London, beginning 18 June 2012. On 11 September 2012, Wizz Air announced new routes to and from Tel Aviv, Israel.

On 12 April 2013, Wizz Air announced that it would start flights from Budapest Airport to Baku's Heydar Aliyev International Airport starting from 17 June 2013. On 26 June 2013, Wizz Air announced entry into the Slovakian market, adding one new route from Košice International Airport starting from September 2013.

In October 2013 Wizz Air launched flights to Dubai from Bucharest, Budapest, Kyiv and Sofia.

On 26 June 2015, the airline opened its 19th base at Tuzla International Airport in Bosnia and Herzegovina and deployed one new Airbus A320 aircraft at the airport. With one aircraft stationed at the airport, Wizz Air opened new routes to Memmingen Airport (near Munich) and Sandefjord Airport, Torp (near Oslo), commencing on 26 June 2015, as well as to Frankfurt–Hahn Airport and Stockholm Skavsta Airport, commencing on 28 June 2015.

In February 2016, Wizz Air announced a new base at David the Builder Kutaisi International Airport (serving Kutaisi in Georgia). In October 2016 Wizz Air announced a new base at Chișinău International Airport (serving Chișinău) in Moldova. In December 2016, Wizz Air announced a new base in Varna, Bulgaria.

In February 2017, Wizz Air announced a new base at London Luton Airport in the United Kingdom. Also in 2017, the company added three new routes, to Tel Aviv, Israel; Pristina, Kosovo; and Kutaisi, Georgia, for a total of over 500 routes.

In January 2018, Wizz Air announced a new base at Vienna International Airport in Austria. Three Airbus 320/321 are planned to be based in Vienna and the company will operate a total of 17 new routes from the Austrian capital.

In November 2018, the airline announced it would open a base at Kraków John Paul II International Airport in Poland, starting with 12 routes.

In May 2021, Wizz Air announced the termination of all its domestic routes in Norway, which had been operating for less than a year.

In March 2022, Wizz Air announced that it will commence scheduled flights to the city of Hambantota, Sri Lanka from Abu Dhabi, UAE. 

At the end of 2022, the airline launched new destinations to Tashkent and Samarkand (Uzbekistan).

Fleet

, the Wizz Air Group fleet consists of the following aircraft:

Environmental protection
In November 2019, Wizz Air dismissed concerns about its part in environmental damage raised by the "flight shame" movement, basing its response on the airline's per-passenger emission level. The company said it would reduce per capita emissions by an additional 30 percent by 2030. Wizz Air also condemned inefficient airlines such as Lufthansa that offered business class and used outdated technologies, which according to Wizz Air cause far more environmental damage.

As part of Wizz Air's fuel-saving strategy, all phases of take-off and landing are continuously monitored for maximum environmental optimization, which has a significant impact on further continuous reductions in CO2 emissions.

In May 2022, they announced that they are aiming to switch from fossil fuels to hydrogen propulsion within 10-15 years as part of a pilot project with Airbus. The need for this ongoing transition has been explained not only by direct environmental and technological considerations, but also by business reasons, saying that over time both passengers and investors will increasingly expect airlines to operate in a more environmentally friendly way.

In November 2022, Wizz Air signed an agreement with the Austrian energy company OMV to purchase nearly 185,000 tonnes of sustainable aviation fuel (SAF) from 2023 to 2030.SAF, produced from sustainable feedstocks such as edible oil and green hydrogen, could be a key element in the aviation industry's goal of zero carbon emissions by 2050. The International Air Transport Association (IATA) estimates that SAF could contribute around 65 percent to the aviation sector's net zero emissions reduction target by 2050.

The cooperation with OMV under the SAF contract provides Wizz Air with the opportunity to move forward with its strategy to continuously reduce its carbon intensity per passenger-kilometre and reduce its carbon intensity by a further 25 percent by 2030 and to eliminate its carbon emissions completely by 2050. The Wizz Air-OMV agreement demonstrates the airline's commitment to ensuring that its passengers choose the most environmentally responsible way of flying by choosing to fly with Wizz Air.

A few days before the SAF contract was signed, Wizz Air won the Global Environmental Sustainability Airline Group of the Year. The award was presented for the first time by CAPA (Centre for Aviation) at the Asia Aviation Summit and Sustainability Expo 2022 in Singapore. CAPA, a member of the Aviation Week Network, is one of the world's most trusted sources of market information for the aviation and tourism industries. In addition to global recognition, Wizz Air also won the Sustainable Airline of the Year Award in the Europe, Middle East and Africa (EMEA) region. The citation stated that Wizz Air was among the top performing airlines in most categories, according to CAPA's Environmental Sustainability Airline Performance Assessment Report 2021 and 2022.

Incidents
On 8 June 2013, Wizz Air Flight 3141, an Airbus A320-232 (registration HA-LWM) from Bucharest Henri Coandă Airport, Romania to Rome-Ciampino, Italy, made an emergency landing at Leonardo da Vinci–Fiumicino Airport when the crew encountered problems lowering one of the main undercarriages and locking it into position. The aircraft diverted to Fiumicino because of the longer runway, and firefighters applied foam after landing as a precautionary measure. The aircraft was evacuated using slides. Initial reports of injured passengers were denied by both Wizz Air and Rome Fiumicino Airport, who said some passengers requested medical checkups but reported no injuries.

Criticism 
Wizz Air is well known for a strong opposition to any activities of its employees in trade unions. Because of that approach to its employees the company is facing many accusations. One of the first cases was already closed by the Romanian supreme court in 2019 with a verdict that Wizz Air discriminated against its workers. Other cases blaming Wizz Air for a similar attitude against its employees are still open in Ukraine and other countries. In October 2020, the Prime Minister of Norway stated she would not fly with Wizz Air after the company resumed its flights in the country. Wizz Air claimed to allow its employees to be organized in assemblies.

See also
 EasyJet
 Ryanair

Notes

References

External links 

 

Airlines of Hungary
Hungarian brands
Low-cost carriers
Airlines established in 2003
European Low Fares Airline Association
2015 initial public offerings
Companies based in Budapest
Companies listed on the London Stock Exchange
Hungarian companies established in 2003